Kalabi may refer to:
 Kalabi, Hormozgan
 Kalabi, Markazi